Ever since the 2007 municipal reform, the Social Democrats had held the mayor's position in the municipality.

In 2017, the Social Democrats had won 12 seats, just one short of an absolute majority. Still it would be Thomas Adelskov from the party who would become mayor.

Prior to this election, a new party called Nyt Odsherred had been created to try and challenge the mayor's position for the election. They would end up winning 4 seats, and become the party to receive the 3rd highest number of votes.
However they would manage, together with the Danish Social Liberal Party, the Conservatives, the New Right, Danish People's Party and Venstre, to reach an agreement that would see leader of the party, Karina Vincentz become mayor.

Electoral system
For elections to Danish municipalities, a number varying from 9 to 31 are chosen to be elected to the municipal council. The seats are then allocated using the D'Hondt method and a closed list proportional representation.
Odsherred Municipality had 25 seats in 2021

Unlike in Danish General Elections, in elections to municipal councils, electoral alliances are allowed.

Electoral alliances  

Electoral Alliance 1

Electoral Alliance 2

Electoral Alliance 3

Electoral Alliance 4

Results

Notes

References 

Odsherred